Derek John Newark (8 June 1933 – 11 August 1998) was an English actor in television, film and theatre.

Career
Newark began his working life as a soldier in the Coldstream Guards before joining the Royal Artillery. However, he wanted to become an actor, and left the Army to study at the Royal Academy of Dramatic Art.

Newark appeared in a large number of film and television roles, including The Baron (1967), The Avengers (three episodes in the 1960s), Z-Cars (six episodes between 1969 and 1972), Barlow in the regular role of Det. Insp. Tucker (1974–1975) and various other minor roles. He appeared in episodes two to four of the first Doctor Who story An Unearthly Child in 1963. Later he appeared opposite Jon Pertwee in the 1970 story Inferno. Newark also played the role of Spooner, an ill-tempered former Red Devil turned professional wrestler in the series Rising Damp.

In the 1970s, Newark became more involved in the theatre, spending nearly a decade at the Royal National Theatre. While there he was part of the company that opened its current South Bank home and was a cornerstone of the residential company that worked in the smaller Cottesloe Theatre under Bill Bryden's direction. His most important roles there were Bottom in A Midsummer Night's Dream and the world premiere of David Mamet's Glengarry Glen Ross where he played Shelley Levene (a role later played on screen by Jack Lemmon). At the National he also appeared as Malcolm in Alan Ayckbourn's Bedroom Farce, which transferred to the West End and then Broadway. He also created the role of Roote in Harold Pinter's play The Hothouse which premiered in 1980 in a production directed by the playwright. 

Amongst later work on television, he starred in the second series of Juliet Bravo as Councillor Jack Winterbottom. In 1982, Newark played Martin Bormann in the TV series Inside the Third Reich. He appeared as W. C. Fields with Caroline Quentin in the 1983 Channel 4 play Hollywood Hits Chiswick 

In the cinema Newark appeared as Jessard, Sgt. Johnson's (Sean Connery) sidekick in the police drama The Offence (Sidney Lumet 1972).

Death
Newark died of a heart attack, brought on by liver failure after years of alcoholism, on 11 August 1998 in West London.

Filmography

Film

Television

Theatre work
 Bedroom Farce (1977)
 The Hothouse (1980)
 Glengarry Glen Ross (1982)
 A Midsummer Night's Dream (1982)
 Golden Boy (1984)

References

External links

Derek Newark at Theatricalia

1933 births
1998 deaths
English male television actors
English male film actors
People from Great Yarmouth
20th-century English male actors
Alcohol-related deaths in England
Alumni of RADA